Rio de Janeiro is one of the 27 federative units of Brazil. It has the second largest economy of Brazil, with the largest being that of the state of São Paulo. The state, which has 8.2% of the Brazilian population, is responsible for 9.2% of the Brazilian GDP.

The state of Rio de Janeiro is located within the Brazilian geopolitical region classified as the Southeast (assigned by IBGE). Rio de Janeiro shares borders with all the other states in the same Southeast macroregion: Minas Gerais (N and NW), Espírito Santo (NE) and São Paulo (SW). It is bounded on the east and south by the South Atlantic Ocean. Its capital is the city of Rio de Janeiro, which was the capital of the Portuguese Colony of Brazil from 1763 to 1815, of the following United Kingdom of Portugal, Brazil and the Algarves from 1815 to 1822, and of later independent Brazil as a kingdom and republic from 1822 to 1960.

The state's 22 largest cities are Rio de Janeiro, São Gonçalo, Duque de Caxias, Nova Iguaçu, Niterói, Campos dos Goytacazes, Belford Roxo, São João de Meriti, Petrópolis, Volta Redonda, Magé, Macaé, Itaboraí, Cabo Frio, Armação dos Búzios, Angra dos Reis, Nova Friburgo, Barra Mansa, Barra do Piraí, Teresópolis, Mesquita and Nilópolis.

Rio de Janeiro is the smallest state by area in the Southeast macroregion and one of the smallest in Brazil. It is, however, the third most populous Brazilian state, with a population of 16 million people in 2011 (making it the most densely populated state in Brazil) and has the third longest coastline in the country (after those of the states of Bahia and Maranhão).

In the Brazilian flag, the state is represented by Mimosa, the beta star in the Southern Cross (β Cru).

Demonym
The original demonym for the State of Rio de Janeiro is fluminense, from Latin flumen, fluminis, meaning "river". While carioca (from Old Tupi) is an older term, first attested in 1502, fluminense was sanctioned in 1783, twenty years after the city had become the capital of the Brazilian colonies, as the official demonym of the Royal Captaincy of Rio de Janeiro and subsequently of the Province of Rio de Janeiro. From 1783 through the Imperial Regime, carioca remained an unofficial term which other Brazilians used for the inhabitants of the city as well as the province. During the first years of the Brazilian Republic, carioca came to be the name given to those who lived in the city's slums or a pejorative used to refer to the bureaucratic elite of the Federal District. Only when the city lost its status as Federal District (to Brasília) and became the State of Guanabara in 1960 did carioca become an official demonym along with guanabarino. In 1975, Guanabara State was incorporated into Rio de Janeiro State, becoming the present City of Rio de Janeiro. Carioca became the demonym of the city, while fluminense continues to be used for the state as a whole.

History

Hereditary captainships
European presence in Rio de Janeiro dates back to 1502. Rio de Janeiro originated from parts of the captainships of de Tomé and São Vicente. Between 1555 and 1567, the territory was occupied by the French, who intended to install a colony, France Antarctique. Aiming to prevent the occupation of the Frenchmen, in March 1565, the city of Rio de Janeiro was established by Estácio de Sá.

In the 17th century, cattle raising and sugar cane cultivation stimulated the city's progress, which was definitively assured when the port started to export gold extracted from Minas Gerais in the 18th century. In 1763, Rio de Janeiro became the capital of Colonial Brazil. With the flight of the Portuguese royal family from Portugal to Brazil in 1808, the region soon benefited from urban reforms to house the Portuguese. Chief among the promoted changes were: the transformation of agencies of public administration and justice, the creation of new churches, and hospitals, the foundation of the first bank of the country - the Banco do Brasil - and the Royal Press, with the Gazette do Rio of Janeiro. The following years witnessed the creation of the Jardim Botânico (Botanical Garden) and the Academia Real Militar.

There followed a process of cultural enhancement influenced not only by the arrival of the Royal Family, but also by the presence of European graphic artists who were hired to record the society and Brazilian natural features. During this same time, the Escola Real de Ciências, Artes e Ofícios (The Royal School of Sciences, Arts, and Works) was founded as well.

The neutral city
In 1834, the city of Rio de Janeiro was transformed into a "neutral city", remaining as capital of the state, while the captainships became provinces, with headquarters in Niterói, a neighbouring city. In 1889, the city became the capital of the Republic, the neutral city became the federal district and the province a state. In 1894, Petrópolis became the capital of Rio de Janeiro, until 1902 when Niterói recovered its capital status. With the relocation of the federal capital to Brasília in 1960, the city of Rio de Janeiro became Guanabara State. Niterói remained the state capital for Rio de Janeiro state, while Rio de Janeiro served the same status for Guanabara.

The new state of Rio de Janeiro

In 1975, the states of Guanabara and Rio de Janeiro were merged under the name of Rio de Janeiro, with the city of Rio de Janeiro as state capital. The symbols of the former State of Rio de Janeiro were preserved, while the symbols of Guanabara were kept by the city of Rio de Janeiro.

Geography

The state is part of the Mata Atlântica biome and is made up of two distinct morphological areas: a coastal plain, known as baixada, and a plateau, which are disposed in parallel fashion from the shoreline on the Atlantic Ocean inland towards Minas Gerais.

The coastline extends 635 kilometers and is formed by the bays of Guanabara, Sepetiba, and Ilha Grande.
There are prominent slopes near the ocean, featuring also diverse environments, such as restinga vegetation, bays, lagoons and tropical forests.

Most of the state however consists of highlands, often higher than 1000 m, formed by several mountain chains like the Serra do Mar which separates Rio from the state of São Paulo. The highest point of the state, the Pico das Agulhas Negras (Black Needles Peak) is located in the Serra da Mantiqueira which forms the physical border with neighbouring Minas Gerais.

Its principal rivers are the Guandu, the Piraí, the Paraíba do Sul, the Macaé and the Muriaé.

Vegetation and animal life

Tropical forests used to cover more than 90% of the territory of Rio; large portions were devastated for urbanization and for plantations (coffee, sugar cane); preserved areas can be found in the steepest parts of the mountain chains.

The state's tropical coast and river areas are the only remaining habitat of the golden lion tamarin.

Climate

The entire state is located within the tropics (the Tropic of Capricorn passes just a few kilometers south of the state's southernmost point) so a tropical climate is predominant. However, due to altitude, temperatures can drop to freezing point or below in some parts. Frost is not uncommon in some mountainous cities such as Teresópolis, Nova Friburgo and Petrópolis and snow has been reported occasionally in the Itatiaia National Park.

Winters are quite chilly by Brazilian standards with lows around 

Rains tend to be concentrated in the summer (December to March) with a dry season in the winter (June to September).

Demographics

According to the IBGE of 2008, there were 15,772,000 people residing in the state.

Urbanization: 96.9% (2004); Population growth: 1.3% (1991–2000).

The last PNAD (National Household Survey) census revealed the following numbers: 8,509,000 White people (54.2%), 5,302,000 Pardo (Multiracial) people (33.8%), 1,809,000 Black people (11.5%), 25,000 Asian people (0.2%), 19,000 Amerindian people (0.1%).

People of Portuguese ancestry predominate in most of the state. The Brazilian census of 1920 showed that 39,74% of the Portuguese who lived in Brazil lived in Rio de Janeiro. Including all of the Rio de Janeiro, the proportion raised to 46,30% of the Portuguese who lived in Brazil. The numerical presence of the Portuguese was extremely high, accounting for 72% of the foreigners who lived in the capital. Portuguese born people accounted for 20,36% of the population of Rio, and those with a Portuguese father or a Portuguese mother accounted for 30,84%. In other words, native born Portuguese and their children accounted for 51,20% of the inhabitants of Rio, or a total of 267664 people in 1890.

Other European ethnic groups, such as Swiss, Finnish and Germans settled mostly in the mountainous areas (Nova Friburgo, Petrópolis, etc.) and in the capital. Italians and Spaniards are also present in the capital as well as in the surrounding cities.

People of African descent are numerous, particularly in the metropolitan area of the capital city. Those of mixed-race ancestry (tri-racials, mulatos, and some caboclos and cafuzos) make up the majority of the population in many cities. The city of Itaguaí was considered a Japanese colony in the 20th century, but many of the Asian Cariocas that once lived there moved overseas (most of them to Japan) as well to other Brazilian states like São Paulo.

Largest cities

Religion

According to the 2010 Brazilian census, there were 7 324 315 Roman Catholics (45.8%), 4 696 906 Protestants (29.4%), 647 572 Spiritists (4%), and 2 416 303 people without religion (14.6%). There are also adherents of Islam, Judaism, Buddhism, Hinduism, esoterism, neo-paganism, afro-Brazilian religions and Asian religions. Together, the adherents of these and other minorities constitute 6.2% of Rio de Janeiro's population.

Rio de Janeiro is the state with the lowest percentage of Catholics in Brazil, and the state with the highest percentage of people without religion (such as atheists, and agnostics). In addition, it is the state with the highest percentage of spiritists in Brazil. The variety of denominations is a mark of the presence of religious diversity in the demographic profile of the state.

Education
The state of Rio de Janeiro has the 4th best education in Brazil, second only to the Federal District, São Paulo and Goiás.
The state has the fourth lowest illiteracy rate in Brazil, about 4% of its population. The illiteracy rate in the state is compared to countries like Singapore, Portugal, and China.

Colleges and universities
Most of the state's leading universities are public. The most prestigious university is the Federal University of Rio de Janeiro, regarded as the best Federal university in Brazil, and fifth best in Latin America  according to the QS World University Rankings.

Some other well-known colleges, and universities in the state:

Public

 Federal University of Rio de Janeiro (UFRJ)
 State University of Rio de Janeiro (UERJ)
 Fluminense Federal University (UFF)
 Federal University of the State of Rio de Janeiro (UNIRIO)
 Federal Rural University of Rio de Janeiro (UFRRJ)
 Military Institute of Engineering (IME-RJ)
 State University of Northern Rio de Janeiro (UENF)
 Federal Institute of Rio de Janeiro (IFRJ)
 Fluminense Federal Institute (IFF)
 Centro Universitário Estadual da Zona Oeste (UEZO)

Private

Pontifical Catholic University of Rio de Janeiro (PUC-RIO)
Catholic University of Petrópolis (UCP)
Estácio De Sá University (UNESA)
Fundação Getúlio Vargas (FGV)
Universidade Grande Rio (UNIGRANRIO)
Universidade Cândido Mendes (UCAM)
University of Vassouras (USS)
 Universidade Castelo Branco (UCB)
 Universidade Santa Úrsula (USU)
 Universidade Veiga de Almeida (UVA)
 Universidade Salgado de Oliveira (UNIVERSO)

Economy

The industrial sector is the largest component of GDP at 51.6%, followed by the service sector at 47.8%. Agriculture represents 0.6% of GDP (2004). Rio de Janeiro (state) exports: petroleum 44.8%, fuel 17.5%, siderurgy 13%, chemicals 3.6%, not ferrous metals 2.8%, vehicles 2.1% (2002).

Participation in the Brazilian economy: 15.6% (2004).

There are 3,915,724 vehicles in the state (as of Jan. 2006), 10 million mobile phones, 5.3 million telephones, and 92 cities.

Culture

Carnival

The occasion of the last five days leading up to Lent is annually cause for a great explosion of joy in Rio – a round-the-clock party uniting emotions, creativity, plasticity, colours, sounds and much fantasy. It is the greatest popular party in the world, a unique record of the rich cultural melting pot typical of Brazil.  In Rio, it is celebrated in various ways, most famously through the elaborate competition of samba schools comprising thousands of dancers in each school, each of which has composed a new "enredo de samba" (samba script) for the year that is released and popularized by the time Carnaval arrives, thus already recognizable for its lyrics, themes, and rhythms by the energized audience in the bleachers thronging to see the all-night competition of one samba school after another until dawn. Each samba school consists of 'alas' (wings) of samba dancers costumed to carry out one aspect of the theme of the song they all sing.  This event began in the 1930s as a diversion for what politicians sought to assuage as an otherwise restive populace. It came to be held on the bleacher-lined Marques du Sapucai for decades until a covered sambadrome was built in the 1980s.

In other parts of the city, Carnaval festivities include the Banda de Ipanema, a street parade of transvestite costuming that draws its throngs of revelers to the streets of Ipanema.  In the city center on the final night of Carnaval, into the wee hours of Quarta Cinza (Ash Wednesday), a very different flavor of street parade is provided by Quilombo (the word given to slave refugee colonies) with authentic African costuming.  For others, Carnaval is a time of clubbing in costume in more exclusive locales in the Zona Sul.

The film Black Orpheus is set in the context of Carnaval in Rio.

New Year's Eve

In Rio de Janeiro, a globally unique New Year's Eve celebration involves the whole city population. Local inhabitants and visitors join in flocking to the ocean to celebrate the night of the year when thanks are given and wishes are made to the goddess of the sea, Iemanja.  In honor of her traditional garb, celebrants dress in white and bear gifts like flowers, especially white, and even blancmange.  At midnight, beachgoers on the typically hot midsummer night, walk into the surf and cast their flowers (and wishes for the coming year) on the lapping waves to be carried out to honor the goddess (the tradition says that wishes will turn to reality if the waves take the gifts to the sea, and won't if the gifts come back to the beach). Nearby parties, concerts and music last into the dawn, many choosing to sleep it off on the beach on New Year's Day.  In recent years, campfires and the oral tradition of shared stories around statues of Iemanja has modernized into massive fireworks displays and to a mega-concert on the famous beach of Copacabana.

Infrastructure

International airport

Since August 2004, with the transfer of many flights from Santos Dumont Airport, to Rio de Janeiro-Galeão International Airport, Rio de Janeiro has second international airport of Brazil. According to data from the official Brazilian travel bureau, Embratur, nearly 40% of foreign tourists who visit Brazil choose Rio as their gateway, meaning Galeão Airport. Besides linking Rio to the rest of Brazil with domestic flights, Galeão has connections to 18 other countries. It can handle up to 15 million passengers a year in two passenger terminals. Located 20 kilometers from downtown Rio, the international airport is served by several quick access routes, such as the Linha Vermelha/Red Line and Linha Amarela/Yellow Line freeways and Avenida Brasil/Brazil Avenue, thus conveniently serving residents of the city's southern, northern and western zones. There are special shuttle buses linking Galeão to Santos Dumont, and bus and taxi service to the rest of the city.

Highways

The main Federal highways that cross the state are:
BR-101
BR-116
BR-040
BR-354
BR-356
BR-393
BR-465
BR-493
BR-495

Port

Construction is underway on a new Port of Açu.  The port will cover 36 square miles.  This USD 1.6 billion project at Sao Joao da Barra, approximately 280 kilometers from Rio de Janeiro, has been under construction since October 2007 and will be operational in 2013. It is forecast that the port will eventually handle over 63 million tons of iron ore, 10 million tons of steel products, 15 million tons of coal, 5 million tons of dry bulk and 7.5 million tons of general cargo. A breakwater damn to protect ships from ocean waves is also planned.

Sports

Sports are a very popular pastime in Rio de Janeiro. The most popular is association football. Rio de Janeiro is home to four traditional Brazilian football clubs: Flamengo, Vasco, Fluminense and Botafogo. The state football league is Campeonato Carioca. The city of Rio de Janeiro hosted the 2014 FIFA World Cup.  The city built a new stadium near the Maracanã, to hold 45,000 people. It was named after Brazilian ex-FIFA president João Havelange.

Other notable sports events in Rio include the MotoGP Brazilian Grand Prix and the World Beach volleyball finals. Jacarepaguá was the place of Formula One Brazilian Grand Prix into 1978-1990 and the Champ Car event into 1996–1999. WCT/WQS Surf championships were contested on the beaches from 1985 to 2001.

On 2 October 2009, Rio de Janeiro was selected to host the 2016 Olympic Games, which will be the first to be held in South America. The games began in August. Two years ago, in 2014, the FIFA games were held. Much of the infrastructure was used again.

State flag
An eagle, symbol of Brazil's royal family, appears on the state flag with the rock formation Dedo de Deus ("The Finger of God") near Teresópolis in the background.
The outer part of the coat of arms represents the state's agricultural richness, sugarcane (left) and coffee (right).

Flags used in Rio de Janeiro over the years

Gallery

See also
List of Governors of Rio de Janeiro
List of municipalities in Rio de Janeiro
List of country subdivisions by GDP over 100 billion US dollars

Notes

References

External links

Official website 
State Judiciary 
State Assembly 
State University 
Northern State University 
State Attornery Office 
State Civil Defence 
State Military Police 
State Civil Police 

 
States of Brazil

States and territories established in 1975
1975 establishments in Brazil